The Women's Long Jump at the 1980 Summer Olympics in Moscow, Soviet Union had an entry list of 21 competitors, with two qualifying groups (21 jumpers) before the final (13) took place on Thursday July 31, 1980. The Top-12 and ties and all those reaching 6.50 metres advanced to the final.

Summary

Veteran Lidiya Alfeyeva led the qualifying, her 6.78m was just .04 off Viorica Viscopoleanu's Olympic record from Mexico City a dozen years earlier. 

In the first round of the final, Tatyana Skachko bounced the Olympic record by 12cm to 6.96m.  By the end of the round, Brigitte Wujak (6.88m) and Tatyana Kolpakova had also surpassed the previous mark.  In the second round, Anna Włodarczyk also jumped past the old mark.  In the third round, Skachko upped the mark past 7 metres to 7.01m.  Over the next two rounds, the silver medal position tightened as Włodarczyk equalled Wujak's 6.88m, though Wujak held the second best 6.87m tiebreaker, while Kolpakova also had a 6.87m.  In the final round, Siegrun Siegl also added yet another 6.87m to the competition.  Skachko didn't improve but Włodarczyk jumped 6.95m to take over the silver position for a moment.  The next jumper was Kolpakova, who took off remarkably close to the edge of the board.  TV replays showed the Soviet judge hesitate, start to hold up the red (foul) flag, then settling on the white flag to make it a legal jump for the Soviet athlete.  The jump was measured at 7.06m, a new Olympic record, Kolpakova had leapfrogged the field to take the lead.  Wujak followed her with a 7.04m to take the silver position, pushing Skachko to bronze and Włodarczyk off the podium.

Medalists

Qualification round
 Held on Wednesday July 30, 1980

Final

See also
 1978 Women's European Championships Long Jump (Prague)
 1982 Women's European Championships Long Jump (Athens)
 1983 Women's World Championships Long Jump (Helsinki)

References

External links
  Results

L
Long jump at the Olympics
1980 in women's athletics
Women's events at the 1980 Summer Olympics